JEI Corporation (JEI: Jaeneung Educational Institute) is a Korean educational company founded in 1977.
Currently, the headquarters is located at 293 Changgyeonggungro, Jongno-gu, Seoul.
The company is known for its supplementary education programs for children and adults.
JEI offers supplementary learning programs for home education, operating self-learning centers for children (JEI Learning Center) and establishes a general education network in various fields including publishing, broadcasting, IT, printing, distribution, culture and arts.
In particular, the company has been supporting Si-nangsong(poetry recitation) for 27 years since 1991. The founder, Sung-hoon Park, was honored as an honorary poet at the Society of Korean Poets for his contribution to promote the 'Si-nangsong' in Korea. Also, the JCC Art Center located in Hyehwa-dong, recognized as the only work of renowned Japanese architect Tadao Ando in downtown Seoul, is owned and operated by JEI. Outside of S. Korea, JEI's learning program is offered in U.S., Canada, China, Japan, Australia and New Zealand exporting its ‘JEI’ brand globally.

Learning Programs
 In Korea, JEI offers Self-Learning programs for students from age 3 to adults as following. 
 JEI SSRO Math, JEI SSRO Speed Math, Thinking Pizzaa, JEI SSRO Hangeul, JEI SSRO Korea, JEI SSRO Little English, JEI SSRO English, JEI SSRO Little Hanja, JEI SSRO Chinese, JEI SSRO Japanese, JEI SSRO Social Studies, JEI SSRO Science, Thinking Cookie Book
 In countries outside of Korea, JEI offers total of 9 Self-Learning programs adapted for overseas local environment. These are available in English, Chinese and Korean.  
 In English: JEI Math, JEI Problem Solving Math, JEI English, Critical & Creative Thinking, JEI Reading & Writing
 In Chinese: JEI 才能数学, JEI 才能Little英語, JEI 才能英語, 思考的比萨

Cultural activities
 JEI Poetry Recitation Contest (1991~): It is jointly hosted with the Society of Korean Poets and awarded the certificate of 'Si-nangsong-ga' to the winner of the competition.
 Jaenenung Poetry Recitation Association (1994~) : It is an organization that promotes the poetry recitation centering on 'Si-nangsong-ga'.
 JEI Storytelling Contest (2001~)

See also
 Society of Korean Poets
 Si-nangsong
 Honorary Poets
 JCC (Jaeneung Culture Center)

References

External links
 

Companies of South Korea
Jongno District
South Korean companies established in 1977
Education companies established in 1977
Education companies of South Korea